Salt Creek is a small coastal stream in southern Orange County in the U.S. state of California. The  creek drains  in parts of the cities of Laguna Niguel, Dana Point, and San Juan Capistrano. The mostly channelized creek has no named surface tributaries.
The creek begins in the central portion of the city of Laguna Niguel and flows west and south through a narrow canyon referred to as the Salt Creek Corridor, which is mostly inside a long and narrow regional park.
It then flows into the Monarch Beach Golf Course in the city of Dana Point and enters a subsurface storm channel ("Arroyo Salada Storm Channel") which carries it to its discharge point at Salt Creek County Beach.

Name
Salt Creek's name originates from when Spanish explorers named the creek "Arroyo Salado" (Spanish: "Salt Creek"). The name given to the creek by the indigenous people has been lost.

Course
Salt Creek begins in a series of small canyons west of the Street of the Golden Lantern, an arterial roadway that connects with Dana Point at the south end. The canyon the creek begins in is protected as part of the Salt Creek Corridor Regional Park, which covers most of the creek's course. The creek winds west through the narrow gorge, picking up runoff from numerous residential communities both north and south of the Salt Creek Canyon. Just before it crosses beneath Niguel Road, which also runs in a north-south direction, it receives runoff from a large storm drain on the right bank; this drains much of the small valley to the north of the Salt Creek Canyon.

Turning southwest, the creek winds alongside Niguel Road, continuing to flow through a canyon that is not developed but is heavily modified to prevent erosion, especially on the northwest slopes. At this point, the Salt Creek Trail begins to parallel the creek, and continues to the mouth. Upstream of Camino del Avion, which runs east-west, it again enters a concrete pipe and is carried underneath the road to a small pond. Like Niguel Road, Camino del Avion crosses on an earthfill, not a bridge, except for a small section on the southwest which allows the Salt Creek Trail and floodwaters to pass underneath.

The creek receives the water of a large, south-flowing tributary on the right bank; this tributary is now diverted into culverts and called the Arroyo Salada Storm Channel. It is speculated that Sulphur Creek, a tributary of Aliso Creek to the north, originally flowed into this creek, and as a result was a tributary of Salt Creek. Flowing through a golf course in a small canyon near the Pacific, several canyons join the Salt Creek Canyon on the left bank, then Salt Creek is diverted into a massive concrete culvert that takes it underground through the original course of a canyon that is now filled in. The culvert discharges onto a concrete apron at Salt Creek Beach, where Salt Creek is treated before it enters the sea.

Watershed
At  in size, the watershed of Salt Creek is the smallest major watershed in the county. Shaped roughly like a "Y", the two arms of the mostly residential watershed represent the drainage basins of Salt Creek and its major tributary, the Arroyo Salada Storm Channel. Bounded almost entirely by the San Joaquin Hills, the watershed consists of a hilly region east of the Aliso Creek watershed, south of the Sulphur Creek drainage basin, and west of the valley of San Juan Creek and Trabuco Creek. The easternmost part of the watershed lies within San Juan Capistrano, and the southernmost part between Dana Point and Laguna Beach. Two-thirds of the watershed lies within the city of Laguna Niguel.

If not for the uplift of the San Joaquin Hills approximately 1.2 million years ago, the Salt Creek watershed may have a different geography altogether. The unnamed tributary that now is diverted into the Arroyo Salada Storm Channel was once part of the course of Sulphur Creek, a tributary of Aliso Creek to the north. A low saddle now divides the two drainage basins.

Effects of Channelization

Due to channelization during urban development, the source of Salt Creek, which was a small marshy wetland but has been replaced by a community pool, is no longer where it was before the area was developed in the 1990s. At that point, The flow of Salt Creek is channeled into storm drain K01P07, which ends about 1/2 mile to the northeast of the original source at 33.52508, -117.68814. The various storm drains and the obliteration of the original source have in effect moved the source to an area completely under the street of Marina Hills. In addition, the flow of the stream is almost entirely urban runoff during dry seasons. This is evidenced by a constant annual flow, albeit low, which is low in life and the fact that it is choked with stringy algae, the growth of which is stimulated by nitrates from yard fertilizer. Also as a result of this intense channelization, Salt Creek has no surface tributaries and is inhospitable for all but the smallest mosquito fish and tadpoles. Oftentimes, there are soap suds visible on the water's surface, originating from the many residential and commercial entities in the watershed.

History

Like other Orange County creeks south of Aliso Creek and north of San Mateo Creek, the Salt Creek watershed was once part of the territory of the nomadic Acjachemen Native American group, which was later renamed the Juaneño by Spanish missionaries when they founded Mission San Juan Capistrano at the confluence of San Juan and Trabuco Creeks farther south, close to the group's main population center. It is possible that Juaneño villages once were located along the lower channel of Salt Creek, as springs feeding the creek provided a small but stable year round flow.

By the 1960s, residential development had filled most of the available land within the Salt Creek watershed. Mountaintops were flattened and dumped into small canyons to create level land for tract housing and roads. Despite that, the Salt Creek Canyon remained relatively undeveloped, except for a golf course - the Monarch Beach Golf Links - at its southern end, and a golf course surrounding the Arroyo Salada Storm Channel's mainstem. As recently as the 1970s, the lowermost stretch of the Salt Creek Canyon was still in existence. This part of the canyon was also destroyed by landfill for the purpose of building more houses and the Pacific Coast Highway.

Pollution and treatment
The Salt Creek watershed is heavily developed, and as a result, it has been heavily impacted by polluted urban runoff. Prior to the construction of the Salt Creek Ozone Treatment Plant in 2004, at least  flowed freely into the ocean, which caused a toxic plume of pollutants to drift south along the county beach and warrant its frequent closure. The $6.7 million USD facility treats the runoff with ozonation and releases it into the ocean, removing toxins, bacteria, garbage, polluted sediments, and other harmful substances. In effect the plant sterilizes the water, making it safe for contact, although not safe to drink.

See also
List of rivers of Orange County, California
List of rivers of California

References
Notes

Bibliography
Durham, David L. (2001). Durham's Place Names of Greater Los Angeles. Quill Driver Books. .

External links
Orange County Watersheds: Salt Creek Watershed

Rivers of Orange County, California
Santa Ana Mountains
Dana Point, California
Laguna Niguel, California
San Juan Capistrano, California
Rivers of Southern California